Steccherinum subglobosum is a hydnoid fungus of the family Steccherinaceae. Found in China, it was described as new to science by mycologists Hai-Sheng Yuan and Yu-Cheng Dai in 2005. The type collection was found growing on a fallen angiosperm branch in Shennongjia Nature Reserve (Hubei province). The specific epithet subglobobum refers to the somewhat rounded shape of its spores.

References

Fungi described in 2005
Fungi of China
Steccherinaceae
Taxa named by Yu-Cheng Dai